Cheshmeh Bah Meleh Khomsir (also romanized as Cheshmeh Bah Meleh Khomsīr) is a village in Kabgian Rural District, Kabgian District, Dana County, Kohgiluyeh and Boyer-Ahmad Province, Iran. At the 2006 census, its population was 96, in 23 families.

References 

Populated places in Dana County